In high energy physics, event shapes observables are quantities used to characterize the geometry of the outcome of a collision between high energy particles in a collider. Specifically, event shapes observables quantify the general pattern traced by the trajectories of the particles resulting from the collision.

The most common event shape observables include:

The sphericity; 

The aplanarity;

The thrust.

The C-parameter;

The jet broadening.

References

Experimental particle physics